Captain Samuel Butts (November 24, 1777 – January 27, 1814) was a militia officer in the Creek War.

Butts was born at his family's farm in Southampton County, Virginia, to parents Martha and Simmons. His ancestors included many veterans of the American Revolutionary War.  The Butts family moved to Sparta, Georgia, when Samuel was young.

As an adult, Butts moved to Monticello, Georgia, and became a businessman.  In 1813, Butts joined the local militia of Jasper County as a private in order to fight in the War of 1812. He was quickly made captain of his unit, and they fought under the command of General John Floyd in battles at Autossee, Tallasee and Camp Defiance. On January 27, 1814, Butts was killed in Alabama at the Battle of Calebee Creek (referred to as Chillabee in some sources).

In 1825, the Georgia General Assembly named Butts County, Georgia in honor of Captain Butts. A Georgia chapter of the Sons of the American Revolution is named after him as well.

Notes

References
William J. Northen, Men of Mark in Georgia, A. B. Caldwell, 1912, pp. 174–177.
Capt. Samuel Butts Chapter of the Sons of the American Revolution
Georgia.gov profile of Butts County
New Georgia Encyclopedia entry for Butts County, Georgia

1777 births
1814 deaths
People from Southampton County, Virginia
People of the Creek War
Butts County, Georgia
American militiamen in the War of 1812
American military personnel killed in the War of 1812
People from Sparta, Georgia
People from Monticello, Georgia